These page shows the results of the triathlon competition at the 2002 Commonwealth Games in Manchester, England, when the sport (1500 m swimming, 40 km road cycling, and 10 km running) was for the first time on the program. The men's and the women's races were both held at the games last day, 4 August 2002.

Men's competition

Women's competition

Triathlon medal count

References
Results

Commonwealth Games
2002
2002 Commonwealth Games events
Triathlon competitions in the United Kingdom